Haruna is both a feminine Japanese given name and a Japanese surname.

Possible writings
Haruna can be written using different kanji characters and can mean:
春奈, "springtime, Nara"
治南, "govern, south"
晴成, "bright, successful"
春菜, "springtime, vegetable"
春南, "springtime, south"
遥南, "long ago, south"
治成, "reign, to become"
晴名, "bright, name"
張馳, "stretch, run, gallop"
春名, "spring, name"
The name can also be written in hiragana or katakana.

People with the name

Given name
, Japanese female judoka
, Japanese table tennis player
, better known as Halna, Japanese singer
, Japanese athlete who mainly competes in the triathlon
, Japanese voice actress
, Japanese former model, 10th generation member of Morning Musume
, Japanese alpine skier
, Japanese actress and model
, Japanese idol and singer
, Japanese snowboarder
, Japanese pianist and composer
, Japanese idol and singer
, Japanese sport wrestler
, Japanese musician, lead singer and rhythm guitarist of Scandal
, Japanese rower
, Japanese figure skater
, Japanese gravure idol, actress and television personality
, Japanese ice hockey player
, Japanese male aid worker

Surname
, Japanese transgender television personality and singer
, Japanese model and actress
, Japanese child actress
, Japanese singer and fashion model
, Japanese ice hockey player
, better known as Klaha, Japanese singer-songwriter
, Japanese swimmer

Fictional characters

Given name
 Haruna, a character in the manga series Aoki Hagane no Arpeggio
 , a character in the light novel series Kore wa Zombie Desu ka?
 , a character in the manga series Onsen Yōsei Hakone-chan
 Haruna (Tenchi Muyo!), a character in the anime film Tenchi Forever! The Movie
 Haruna, a character in the manga series The World of Narue
 Haruna Kisaragi, a character in the anime and manga series Corrector Yui
 Haruna Morikawa, a character in the television series Kousoku Sentai Turboranger
 Haruna Otonashi, a character in the video game Inazuma Eleven
 , a character in the manga series Working!!
 Haruna Sairenji, a character in the manga series To Love-Ru
 Haruna Sakurada, a character in the manga series Sailor Moon
 Haruna Saotome, a character in the manga series Negima! Magister Negi Magi
 , a character in the visual novel Fortune Arterial

Surname
 , a character in the manga series Hamtaro
 , protagonist of the manga series Fuuka
 , a character in the manga series Big Windup!

Japanese feminine given names
Japanese-language surnames